Wuyi is a county of southeastern Hebei province, China, served by China National Highway 106.

Administrative divisions
The county administers 6 towns and 3 townships.

Towns:
Wuyi, Qingliangdian, Shenpo, Zhaoqiao, Hanzhuang, Xiaoqiaotou

Townships:
Longdian Township, Quantou Township, Dazita Township

Climate

References

External links

County-level divisions of Hebei